Hyde Park is a hamlet and census-designated place (CDP) in the town of Hyde Park, Dutchess County, New York, United States. Its population was 1,908 as of the 2010 census.

The hamlet of Hyde Park is on the western side of the town of Hyde Park, bordered on the west by the Hudson River. The northern edge of the hamlet is Crum Elbow Creek, a tributary of the Hudson. On the north side of the creek, just outside the hamlet, is the Vanderbilt Mansion National Historic Site. The Springwood Estate, preserved as the Home of Franklin D. Roosevelt National Historic Site, is just outside the hamlet to the south.

U.S. Route 9 passes through the center of the hamlet, leading north  to Staatsburg and south  to Poughkeepsie, the county seat.

Geography

Demographics

Government

Contrary to popular belief, the Hyde Park CDP is not a village due to the lack of a village government (mayor, village board, etc.).

References

Geography of Dutchess County, New York
Census-designated places in New York (state)
Hamlets in New York (state)